Leber congenital amaurosis (LCA) is a rare inherited eye disease that appears at birth or in the first few months of life.

It affects about 1 in 40,000 newborns. LCA was first described by Theodor Leber in the 19th century. It should not be confused with Leber's hereditary optic neuropathy, which is a different disease also described by Theodor Leber.

One form of LCA was successfully treated with gene therapy in 2008.

Signs and symptoms
The term congenital refers to a condition present from birth (not acquired) and amaurosis refers to a loss of vision not associated with a lesion. However, beyond these general descriptions, the presentation of LCA can vary, because it is associated with multiple genes.

LCA is typically characterized by nystagmus, sluggish or absent pupillary responses, and severe vision loss or blindness.

Genetics
It is usually autosomal recessive; however, importantly for family planning, it is sometimes autosomal dominant. It is a disorder thought to be caused by abnormal development of photoreceptor cells.

OMIM currently recognizes 18 types of LCA.

The gene  has been associated with Joubert syndrome, as well as type 10 LCA.

Diagnosis

Genetic tests and related research are currently being performed at Centogene AG in Rostock, Germany; John and Marcia Carver Nonprofit Genetic Testing Laboratory in Iowa City, IA; GENESIS Center for Medical Genetics in Poznan, Poland; Miraca Genetics Laboratories in Houston, TX; Asper Biogene in Tartu, Estonia; CGC Genetics in Porto, Portugal; CEN4GEN Institute for Genomics and Molecular Diagnostics in Edmonton, Canada; and Reference Laboratory Genetics - Barcelona, Spain.

Treatment

One form of LCA, in patients with LCA2 bearing a mutation in the RPE65 gene, has been successfully treated in clinical trials using gene therapy. The results of three early clinical trials were published in 2008 demonstrating the safety and efficacy of using adeno-associated virus to deliver gene therapy to restore vision in LCA patients. In all three clinical trials, patients recovered functional vision without apparent side effects. These studies, which used adeno-associated virus, have spawned a number of new studies investigating gene therapy for human retinal disease.

The results of a phase 1 trial conducted by the University of Pennsylvania and Children’s Hospital of Philadelphia and published in 2009 showed sustained improvement in 12 subjects (ages 8 to 44) with RPE65-associated LCA after treatment with AAV2-hRPE65v2, a gene replacement therapy. Early intervention was associated with better results. In that study, patients were excluded based on the presence of particular antibodies to the vector AAV2 and treatment was only administered to one eye as a precaution. A 2010 study testing the effect of administration of AAV2-hRPE65v2 in both eyes in animals with antibodies present suggested that immune responses may not complicate use of the treatment in both eyes. On 19 December 2017, the U.S. Food and Drug Administration approved voretigene neparvovec-rzyl (Luxturna), an adeno-associated virus vector-based gene therapy for children and adults with biallelic RPE65 gene mutations responsible for retinal dystrophy, including Leber congenital amaurosis. Patients must have viable retinal cells as a prerequisite for the intraocular administration of Luxturna.

Retina surgeon Dr. Albert Maguire and gene therapy expert Dr. Jean Bennett developed the technique used by the Children's Hospital.

Dr. Sue Semple-Rowland at the University of Florida has recently restored sight in an avian model using gene therapy.

In March 2020, doctors at the Casey Eye Institute of the Oregon Health & Science University injected a CRISPR-modified virus into a patient's eye in an attempt to treat LCA10.

Popular culture
 In the episode "The Blackout in the Blizzard" (season 6, episode 16) of the television drama Bones, Dr. Jack Hodgins and his pregnant wife Angela Montenegro, who is an LCA carrier, have to wait during a citywide blackout for Hodgins's genetic test results, to see if he is also an LCA carrier. He does indeed turn out to be a carrier, giving their unborn child a 25% chance of having LCA.
 In the television series ER (season 14, episode 12 "Believe the Unseen") Dr. Abby Lockhart diagnoses a young foster girl with Leber congenital amaurosis. The girl to this point hid her condition from her foster families. The episode contains some information about symptoms, clinical diagnosis and mentions gene replacement therapy and clinical trials as hope for help in managing the condition.
 In the Korean drama The King of Dramas (episode 16, "In Search of Lost Time") Anthony Kim, played by Kim Myung-min, is diagnosed with Leber congenital amaurosis, the same disease that made his mother blind.
 Four-year-old Gavin who suffers from a form of LCA was made famous in 2013 by a YouTube video showing him using his white cane for the first time to navigate down a curb. He later appeared on the TV show Little Big Shots.

See also 
 Visual cycle

References

Further reading

External links 
 GeneReview/NIH/UW entry on Leber Congenital Amaurosis

Visual disturbances and blindness
Cell surface receptor deficiencies
Rare diseases